Alec Stewart Horsley (1 September 1902 – 11 June 1993) was a British businessman, Quaker, and supporter of the peace movement. He was also the founder of Northern Foods.

Personal life and family
Born in Ripley, Derbyshire and educated at Worcester College, Oxford, where he read PPE, Alec Horsley entered and later abandoned the Colonial Service. In 1932 he married Susan Howitt. They had two daughters and three sons, one of whom was Nicholas Horsley; grandfather to Sebastian Horsley, author Jason Horsley and Ashley Horsley. At the time of his death he had 15 grandchildren and 9 great-grandchildren. He was keen on sport and when he was in Nigeria he played tennis for the country, and when he ceased to play tennis he took up golf. He was a great friend of the biologist, John Boyd Orr.

Career
In 1932 he joined his father's condensed milk business, Pape and Co., Ltd., a small Hull-based concern importing Dutch condensed milk for wholesale. He established a small condensed-milk factory at Holme-on-Spalding-Moor in 1937 and expanding it so creating Northern Dairy (later renamed Northern Foods), one of the United Kingdom's largest food manufacturers.

He joined Sir Richard Acland's Common Wealth Party during the 1940s, participated in the Committee of 100 and was a lifelong member of the Society of Friends. In 1943 he founded the Hull branch of the Fabian Society, was a city councillor on Hull Council from 1945 to 1949, and Sheriff of Kingston upon Hull in 1953. He was a prison reformer and founder membership of CND which led him to support the Department of Peace Studies at Bradford University, and was made an Honorary Fellow of Worcester College, Oxford under the Provostship of Asa Briggs, who also wrote his obituary.

Later life and death
In 1982 he was given an honorary Doctorate in Science from the University of Hull. He retired as Chairman at Northern Foods in 1987, but remained Life President until he died in Hessle in 1993.

He was the subject of the first part of The Vice of Kings: How Fabianism, Occultism, and the Sexual Revolution Engineered a Culture of Abuse, by his grandson Jasun Horsley, published by Aeon Books in 2018.

See also
List of peace activists

References

1902 births
1993 deaths
Alumni of Worcester College, Oxford
British chief executives
English Quakers
People from Ripley, Derbyshire
People from Holme-on-Spalding-Moor
20th-century British businesspeople
20th-century Quakers